Odunsi is a surname. Notable people with the surname include:

Akin Babalola Kamar Odunsi, Nigerian businessman and politician
Anthony Odunsi (born 1992), American-born Nigerian basketball player
Leke Odunsi (born 1980), British footballer
Tomi Odunsi (born 1987), Nigerian television actress, singer and songwriter